Jack H. Clayton (January 4, 1915 – January 26, 1997) was an American football, basketball, and baseball coach. He served as the head men's basketball coach at Centenary College of Louisiana during the 1946–1947 before moving to Bowling Green, Kentucky to become the head football coach at Western Kentucky State College from 1948 to 1956. Clayton later became the head football coach (1957–1966) and head baseball coach (1967–1968) at Northwestern State University in Natchitoches, Louisiana.

A native of Haughton, Louisiana, Clayton died of congestive heart failure, on January 26, 1997, at Willis-Knighton Hospital in Shreveport, Louisiana.

Head coaching record

College football

References

External links
 

1915 births
1997 deaths
Basketball coaches from Louisiana
Centenary Gentlemen basketball coaches
Northwestern State Demons football coaches
Northwestern State Demons baseball coaches
Western Kentucky Hilltoppers football coaches
High school football coaches in Louisiana
People from Haughton, Louisiana